Campoli Appennino is a comune (municipality) in the Province of Frosinone in the Italian region Lazio, located about  east of Rome and about  northeast of Frosinone.

Campoli Appennino borders the following municipalities: Alvito, Broccostella, Pescasseroli, Pescosolido, Posta Fibreno, Sora, Villavallelonga.

See also
National Park of Abruzzo, Lazio e Molise

References

Cities and towns in Lazio